Big Sandy Lake is a lake in the Canadian province of Saskatchewan. The lake is north-east of Narrow Hills Provincial Park at the eastern base of the Cub Hills in the Northern Administration District. It is situated in the Mid-Boreal Uplands Ecoregion in a boreal forest of pine, birch, aspen, and spruce.

Along the northern shore of Big Sandy Lake is an outfitter and a provincial recreation site. Access is from the Hanson Lake Road.

Description 
Several creeks and rivers flow into the lake from the slopes of the Cub Hills, nearby smaller lakes, and surrounding muskeg. Some of those lakes include Jayjay, Minnow, Warne, Floren, and Beck. Ballantyne River flows out of Big Sandy Lake from its eastern shore and heads east flowing into Deschambault Lake. Big Sandy Lake is in the Sturgeon-Weir River drainage basin, which is a tributary of the Saskatchewan River.

Outfitter and recreation site 
Big Sandy Lake Recreation Site has a campground with 13 campsites and the outfitters, Big Sandy Lake Outdoor Adventures, has cabin rentals. The outfitter leases and operates the 430-hectare recreation site from the provincial government. The campground and cabins have access to washrooms, showers, and laundry. At the lake, there is a boat launch and fish cleaning station. Other activities at the site include hiking, ATVing, and, in the winter, snowmobiling.

Fish species 
Fish commonly found in the lake include walleye, northern pike, and whitefish.

See also 
List of lakes of Saskatchewan
Tourism in Saskatchewan
List of protected areas of Saskatchewan

References 

Lakes of Saskatchewan